Saluri Rajeswara Rao (11 October 1922 – 25 October 1999) was an Indian composer, multi instrumentalist, conductor, singer, and music producer known for his works predominantly in South Indian cinema. Regarded as one of the finest music composers, Rajeswara Rao's works are noted for integrating Indian classical music in Telugu cinema for over half a century.

In his recordings, Rajeswara Rao pioneered the use of light music in Telugu cinema. Rajeswara Rao's most rewarding assignments came from Gemini Studios, which he joined in 1940 and with which he remained for a decade.

After leaving Gemini, he received an offer to provide music for B. N. Reddy's Malliswari in 1950; the songs were a hit. Vipranarayana (1954), Missamma (1955) and a host of other musical hits – more than a hundred in Telugu most of which won the National Film Awards for best film(s), and Tamil and a few in Kannada – followed. When Vijaya's Missamma (originally a Telugu film) was remade as Miss Mary in Bollywood, the film's soundtrack retained one of Rajeswara Rao's compositions.

Early career

Rajeswara Rao's introduction to cinema came unexpectedly, in the form of Mr. Huchins' (of the Huchins Recording Company) visit to Rajeswara Rao's home district of Vizianagaram in 1934. A child prodigy, Rajeswara Rao could identify the Carnatic music ragams at age four; by the time he was seven, he was giving stage performances. Huchins spotted young Rajeswara Rao's talent, and took him to Bangalore with his father; there, young Rao recorded "Bhagawat Gita". Film producers P. V. Das and Gudavalli Ramabramham visited Bangalore and, impressed by Rajeswara Rao's singing ability, brought him to Madras. They cast him as Lord Krishna in their production of Sri Krishna Leelalu in 1934. The film was released the next year (1935) and Rajeswara Rao became a household name all over Andhra Pradesh.

Rajeswara Rao went to Calcutta (now Kolkata) to act in Keechaka Vadha, and met such stalwarts as Kundan Lal Saigal and Pankaj Mullick. He became a disciple of Saigal and studied Hindustani music for a year, learning to play the sitar and surbahar. Rajeswara Rao had already mastered playing the tabla, dholak, and mridangam; later instruments were piano, harmonium, mandolin and electric guitar. He learned orchestration, and how to mix the sounds of different instruments.

Music director
Returning to Madras in 1938, Rajeswara Rao formed his own music troupe. He worked as assistant to Jayaramayyar for a Tamil film, Vishnuleela, in which he also played the role of Balarama and sang his own songs. He became a full-fledged music director on the film Jayaprada. He continued acting in Bala Nagamma and Illalu (in which he played opposite his singing partner, R. Balasaraswathi Devi).

When Rajeswara Rao entered the industry, there was no playback system. The actors sang and acted at the same time as the orchestra played in the background, unseen by the camera. While he was making Illalu, the playback system became popular.

Among the classical ragas, Rajeswara Rao liked "Mohanam" "Bhimplas (Abheri)", "Sindhu Bhairavi", "Kafi", "Kalyani", "Pahad" and "Malkauns (Hindolam)", which he used most frequently in his songs.

He not only integrated Indian Classical Music but also experimented with foreign music styles (Persian, Arabic, Spanish) in his Malliswari (1951 film).

People with love called him 'RA"SALURU"' (Juicy) Rajeswara Rao, as it was his compositions, which seemed to have made people to feel like eating/drinking sweet juices while listening to them.In other words he is capable of illustrating NAVARASA's (Nine Moods/Emotional states) with his compositions. His songs "Narayana Nee Leela NAVARASA Bharitam" and "Manavude Mahaneeyudu" from 1972 film Bala Bharatam stands testimony for this.

Whether it was "Mrogindi Kalyana Veena" from Kurukshetram (1977 film) or "Abhinandana Mandara Maala" from Tandra Paparayudu (film) he always has shown authenticity in his mark compositions. His two assistants (for over four decades), Rajagopal and Krishnan – both well-versed in classical music – were an asset to him.

Never compromised with self respect, known for his sensitive nature, he walked away from many projects, similar to Daana Veera Soora Karna film.

At times, he only whispered saying " Vaari ki Vaare Kaavali, Memu Avasaramu Ledu". So much of depth in those words from this Bengali Ras Malai.It is Sour Curry time!.
He was one of the music directors to make use of Persian music in Indian film compositions.

Personal life
Rao was born in the village of Sivaramapuram, near Salur in Vizianagaram district (formerly Srikakulam district), Andhra Pradesh, India. His father, Sanyasi Raju, was a famous mridangam player at concerts performed by Dwaram Venkataswamy Naidu and also a lyricist. 

Rajeswara Rao was married to Rajeswari Devi; the couple had five sons and four daughters. His eldest son, Saluri Ramalingeswara Rao, was a piano and electric-organ player in South India. His second son, Saluri Poornachandra Rao, was a guitarist. His third and fourth sons, Saluri Vasu Rao and Saluri Koteswara Rao (Koti), are also music directors in the Telugu film industry. Rajeswara Rao's youngest son, Saluri Koti Durga Prasad, is not associated with the film industry. His daughters are Ramadevi, Mangamma, Kousalya, and Vijayalakshmi. Rajeswara Rao's elder brother, Saluri Hanumantha Rao, was a music director in the Kannada and Telugu film industry.

Awards and honors
Honorary doctorate Kalaprapoorna in 1979 by Andhra University
Asthana Vidwan of Tirumala Tirupati Devasthanams, during which time he composed music for Annamacharya Keerthanas.
Kalaimamani award from Tamil Nadu Iyal Isai Nataka Mandram
Raghupathi Venkaiah Award from the Andhra Pradesh for his outstanding contribution to Telugu cinema in 1992
''Nandi Award for Best Music Director in 1980 for Sri Vasavi Kanyaka Parameswari Mahathmyam
On 10 October 2018, Indian Post issued a commemorative postage stamp in honour of Saluri Rajeswara Rao.

Travel
Rajeswara Rao visited the United States of America in 1981, performing at the Telugu Association of North America conference and the Telugu Literary and Cultural Association (TLCA).

Filmography

See also
Raghupathi Venkaiah Award

References

1922 births
1999 deaths
Indian male film actors
Telugu film score composers
Tamil film score composers
Kannada film score composers
Telugu playback singers
20th-century Indian male actors
20th-century Indian composers
People from Vizianagaram district
Film musicians from Andhra Pradesh
20th-century Indian singers
Indian male film score composers
20th-century Indian male singers